Richard Jason "R.J." Helton (born May 17, 1981; as Rolando Alberto de Jesus Rivas, Jr.) is an American Contemporary Christian music artist, who first came to prominence as the fifth place finalist on the first season of American Idol. The first Wild Card contestant in the history of the series, he initially failed to reach the Top 10, but was brought back by the judges to compete in the finals. In 2004, he released the album Real Life with GospoCentric Records, which peaked at #14 on the Billboard Christian Music chart.

Early life and background
Helton was born in Pasadena, Texas, on May 17, 1981, as Rolando Alberto de Jesus Rivas, Jr., to a Nicaraguan father. Shortly after his birth, he was adopted and renamed Richard Jason Helton. At the time of Helton's American Idol appearance, his adoptive parents, Glen and Sue Helton, worked respectively as a vice president of Popeyes Chicken and as an administrative assistant for an architecture firm. From the age of three, Helton impressed his parents with vocal imitations of various music artists. He sang in church growing up and started performing in talent shows at age five. Soon after, he was enrolled in a performing arts school. By high school, he was involved in community theater. Before going on American Idol, he was a youth worship leader at his church.

When Helton first started performing music publicly as a child, he still lived in Pasadena, but his father's job caused the family to move frequently. Helton lived in Winston-Salem, North Carolina when he was in middle school. He transferred schools about a dozen times until he was midway through ninth grade, at which time his family established long-term residency in the Atlanta area. He graduated from Central Gwinnett High School in 1999.

At age sixteen, Helton began performing in schools across the East Coast and the Ohio Valley, as part of a music tour that was sponsored by Reader's Digest. Helton performed over 150 shows on the tour, over the course of two years. Paula Abdul and the Backstreet Boys both had performed in earlier versions of that same tour at the start of their respective careers.

After high school, Helton moved to Nashville, where he joined a Christian boyband called Soul Focus. While in Nashville, he also worked as a waiter. According to the bio on Helton's (now-defunct) official website, Soul Focus "was invited to tour with a major Christian artist." A 2004 profile on Helton published by CCM Magazine wrote that, around the time that Helton was in Soul Focus, "he went on the road for another artist, selling merchandise". By the end of 2001, Soul Focus had disbanded without a record deal. Helton then moved back to Atlanta, where, according to CCM Magazine, he worked as "a personal trainer and a gymnastics instructor for children." The Atlanta Journal-Constitution reported that, before he went on American Idol, Helton "taught dance" at the YMCA in Alpharetta.

Before moving to Nashville to join Soul Focus, Helton had recorded demo albums that, according to the Mansfield News Journal, had been "turned down by a few record companies." Helton later recounted his experiences in Nashville, saying, "I was kind of discouraged when I got back, but I've never been the type to just give up when I've got my sights set on something. I had learned a lot from the whole Soul Focus experience that really prepared me for things that were to come." Less than a week after resettling in Atlanta, Helton learned through a television commercial about the auditions for American Idol's first season.

In addition to Christian music, Helton was inspired by a variety of genres, including R&B, pop, and contemporary country. Around the time of his American Idol audition, Plus One, Jars of Clay, and India Arie were among his favorite artists. He has also cited Mariah Carey, Boyz II Men, Bryan White, Vince Gill, and Natalie Grant as some of his primary musical influences.

American Idol
Helton auditioned for season one of American Idol in Atlanta. He was the first person to audition in the city. His performance during the Top 30 semi-finals polarized the judges, causing Simon Cowell and Randy Jackson to break into a lengthy argument. Although the conflict was real, it was partially redubbed and also edited together with staged takes before going to air, so as to make it less heated. In his 2011 book, American Idol: The Untold Story, Richard Rushfield noted that even as the fight was sanitized for broadcast, American Idol "reveled in the altercation" and "was all but turned over to repeating the clips". Rushfield identified this as a defining moment in the early history of reality television, writing, "All of a sudden, here was this renegade show, American Idol, that was celebrating its backstory, playing up its frictions, and openly acknowledging its missteps. Every tabloid brouhaha would be played up on the Idol stage rather than being shoved under the carpet. It was completely unprecedented in American programming."

Although not voted through to the Top 10 during the semi-finals, Helton was chosen by the judges as the season's only Wild Card finalist. While participating in a photo shoot during the first week of the finals, he fell off a stage and was briefly hospitalized. Helton's performances throughout the finals continued to divide the judges, and he was voted out of the competition in fifth place. A week after he left the competition, Q100 radio hosted a homecoming party for Helton at the Mall of Georgia.

The 2005 book Uncloudy days : the gospel music encyclopedia by Bil Carpenter summarized Helton's time on American Idol by writing, "Though he has a pleasant, smooth vocal, he was criticized by the judges for having a somewhat stiff and wooden stage presence." Carpenter called Helton "A well-mannered, humble Christian" and felt that these attributes were not always appreciated by the media. Burt Bacharach, who mentored during the Top 5 week of competition, complimented Helton as having "a real sweetness about his persona".

During the competition, Rodney Ho of The Atlanta Journal-Constitution wrote that Helton "exudes an enduring innocence". He further called Helton a "sweet teenybopper favorite" who had "shown surprising strength in the competition" and praised Helton's performance of the Stevie Wonder song "Superstition". However Ho also considered Helton less attention-grabbing than some of the other finalists from American Idol's first season. While Kevin D. Thompson of The Palm Beach Post expressed admiration for Helton's ability to rise above Simon Cowell's criticism, he concurred with Ho a few weeks into the finals that Helton was likely to be overshadowed by some of the other competitors. 
By the Top 6 round, Zap2It called Helton one of the "longshots" to win the competition. Richard L. Eldredge of The Atlanta Journal-Constitution considered Helton's elimination from the series a "surprise", noting that Helton's performance during Top 5 week had been well received. Ho disagreed, expressing the view that Helton was an underdog who had "lasted longer than many expected".

During his time on American Idol, Sharon Waxman of The Ottawa Citizen called Helton a "heartthrob", while Carla Hay of Billboard described him as a "singer with teen Idol looks". An article published by Northwest Florida Daily News at the time likened Helton to The Backstreet Boys. Further boyband comparisons came from Dana Gee of The Province, who wrote that Helton had that "cross between Joey Fatone and Lance Bass thing going on", Julie Hinds of the Detroit Free Press, who wrote that Helton possessed "the peppy personality of a boy-band star", and Jessica Shaw of Entertainment Weekly, who upon Helton's elimination from the competition wrote, "I'm sure there are a few prayer-loving teens who are weeping their eyes out, but the rest of us know what Simon knew all along: This guy was barely good enough to be a boy-band understudy." John Benson of the Mansfield News Journal described Helton instead as "falling somewhere between Boyz II Men and Craig David". Tom Conroy of US Weekly compared Helton to Jon Secada, writing that the two singers shared "the same endearing humility, brimming passion and sturdy-but-not-flashy vocal style."

Performances

Music career

2002–2003: American Idol tours and related projects 
Helton returned to American Idol shortly after his fifth-place finish on the series to perform a group medley during the season one finale. Through October and November 2002, he joined his fellow finalists from that season of the series as a performer on the American Idols Live! Tour. During that tour, he reprised his performance of the Stevie Wonder song "Lately", which he had performed on American Idol during the Wild Card round. Helton also recorded "Lately" for the compilation album, American Idol: Greatest Moments, which charted at #4 on the Billboard 200. USA Today considered Helton's track to be one of the album's highlights, describing it as "a sweetly affecting cover".

Shortly before the 2002 American Idol tour, The St. Petersburg Times reported that Helton was "talking to record labels" and pursuing a career in Christian music. On November 28, 2002, Helton performed during the lighting of Macy's Great Tree at the Rich's department store in Atlanta's Lenox Square. Also performing at the event were Charlotte Church, Usher, Jaci Velasquez, Francine Reed, the Georgia Mass Choir, and B5. By the end of 2002, Helton had established a deal to appear alongside other American Idol finalists in commercials for Old Navy. Throughout the Spring of 2003, Helton participated in Coca-Cola's Behind the Scenes With American Idol promotional tour, in which he and a selection of other finalists from the first two seasons of the series performed across the country in shopping malls owned by the Simon Property Group. In May of that year, The Atlanta Journal-Constitution reported that Helton had been cast "in a local independent film" titled Mrs. Johnson. That June, Helton performed at the Southeast Emmy Awards and in a benefit concert for community service organizations in Forsyth, Georgia. Towards the end of 2003, Helton participated in The Hollywood Reporter/Billboard Film & TV Music Conference.

2003–2005: GospoCentric Records 
During his time on American Idol, Helton said that he would likely title a debut album I'm Real. He expressed satisfaction with his fifth-place finish on the series, saying that he was glad to avoid the restrictive contract offered to the winner. In May 2003, it was reported that he had signed with B-Rite Music, the pop music imprint of Christian music label GospoCentric Records. At the time, his debut album was scheduled to be released that fall. Helton told CCM Magazine that he signed with B-Rite Music after first turning down offers from secular labels. He explained that his decision was largely driven by a desire to be on the same label as Kirk Franklin, describing the singer as an inspiration "who broke down so many walls [between the mainstream and Christian markets]". Shortly after the record deal was announced, Billboard reported that Helton's album would feature "an inspirational gospel feel and mainstream appeal". Leading up to the album's release, Helton was featured on the compilation album Gotta Have Gospel, which was released on November 11, 2003, as a collaboration between GospoCentric Records and Integrity Gospel. "My Devotion", from Helton's then-upcoming debut album, was his featured track on Gotta Have Gospel. According to Billboard, the song "became a hit in the United Kingdom and [was] played in clubs in the United States."

After missing its initial Fall 2003 release date, Helton's debut album, Real Life, was set to be released on March 9, 2004. After a second delay, the album was released on March 23 of that year. The album charted on Billboard, peaking at #14 on the Christian Albums chart and at #19 on the Heatseekers Albums chart. The song "All We Need to Know" was released as a single ahead of the album. "Even If" was also released as a single from the album that year.

On April 29, 2004, Helton performed at the Billboard Latin Music Conference. That same month, he performed at Fort Hood in a homecoming celebration for a portion of the United States Army's 4th Infantry Division, after members of that division participated in the capturing of Saddam Hussein. Also performing at the Fort Hood event were Jessica Simpson, Randy Travis, Ludacris, cheerleaders from the Dallas Cowboys and the New England Patriots, Lynyrd Skynyrd, Eddie Griffin, Stone Cold Steve Austin, and American Idol season 2 finalist Kimberley Locke. Throughout the Spring of 2004, Helton and Locke both provided commentary on American Idol's third season for USA Today, alongside 'Weird Al' Yankovic and Edna Gundersen. On May 6 of that year, Helton sang the National Anthem at Daytona International Speedway for a National Day of Prayer event. Casting Crowns also performed at the event. On June 18, Helton, along with Matthew West and Jadon Lavik, performed at the 2004 Visalia Chamber of Commerce 51st annual Awards Banquet. Later that month, Helton, along with Patti LaBelle, India Arie, Mary Mary, and Kirk Franklin, performed at Mega Fest, a conference held in Atlanta by Bishop T. D. Jakes. Helton also performed in a concert that month at the Christian Booksellers Association International Convention in Atlanta with Rob Lacey, BarlowGirl, Michael Cook, and KJ-52.

On July 5, 2004, Helton served as a judge for the Reno Idol singing competition, which was held at the Eldorado Hotel-Casino. On August 28, he served as a judge for another singing competition, this one held, as part of a fundraiser with a Christian ministry, at Prairie du Chien High School. The following year, on July 8, he served as a judge for the Fayette Idol singing competition in Fayetteville. In August 2005, Helton told The Atlanta Journal-Constitution that he had begun working on a second album, which, the publication wrote, would go in "an unspecified new direction". Helton said at the time, "Stay with me and hold on tight, because this change in music is about to be a joyous, fun and bumpy ride."

2006–present: Later career 
By 2006, Helton's music career had stalled. That year, in October, during a conversation with Larry Flick on the LGBTQ-focused radio program OutQ in the Morning, in response to a question about why he was no longer making music, Helton came out as gay and said, "I can have a faith but can't be who I want to be. So a lot of it was just personal things I needed to overcome and just be proud of who I was. … Just because I am gay does not mean I can't love God." Helton later told The Advocate that when he was on American Idol, he had come out to "some of the assistant producers" but had been "advised" to keep his sexuality private. Around the time of the American Idol tour in 2002, Helton had come out to his fellow season one finalist Jim Verraros, who is also gay. After Helton came out publicly, Verraros said, "I can't even imagine how difficult it was dealing with the gospel community and putting out a Christian record; having this kind of secret must have been really trying for him."

In November 2006, The Atlanta Journal-Constitution reported that Helton was "living in New York" and "writing an autobiography". The publication also wrote that he was "hoping to get into music producing and songwriting." In 2007, Helton was a performer on the Caribbean Princess, as part of RSVP Vacation's Caribbean Fantasy Cruise. Later that year, it was reported that he was living in San Francisco, and in June of that year, he performed in St. Louis PrideFest. Over the summer of 2008, Helton joined with former American Idol finalists Haley Scarnato, Brandon Rogers, Scott Savol, Vonzell Solomon, and Carmen Rasmussen for "America's Favorite Finalists", a month long show in Branson, Missouri, and later that summer, he joined with a rotating group of former American Idol finalists for "Idols in Concert", an event organized by American Idol pianist and arranger Michael Orland, which was held at the Hotel Nikko in San Francisco. The following year, starting in May, Helton joined with former American Idol finalists Nikki McKibbin, Mikalah Gordon, and Jasmine Trias for "Idolized", a show held in Las Vegas. That November, he and Gordon joined with former American Idol finalists Chikezie and Trenyce for a concert at Slippery Rock University. In April 2010, Helton participated in Idol Gives Back by joining with Feeding America and City Harvest to support food banks in New York City. In August of that year, he performed in Madison Wisconsin's Pride Fest. Over the summer of 2012, Helton joined with former American Idol finalists Ruben Studdard, Bo Bice, Vonzell Solomon, and Katie Stevens for The Finalists Live, a fifteen-week music tour.

The album Scott Alan Live, released June 26, 2012, features Helton singing the track "Blessing". The song, written by Alan, expresses the experience of coming out as gay to a parent. The Advocate described "Blessing" as an "emotional performance". Helton later recorded a studio version of the song for the album Scott Alan's GREATEST HITS, VOL. 1, which was released on November 4, 2014.

Discography

Albums

Compilation appearances

Singles

References

External links
 AllMusic profile
 Official website (Archived: 2004 – 2005)
 Official website (Archived: 2007 – 2013)

American performers of Christian music
American Idol participants
Songwriters from Georgia (U.S. state)
Songwriters from Texas
Songwriters from North Carolina
GospoCentric artists
American people of Nicaraguan descent
American gay musicians
LGBT people from Texas
1981 births
Living people
21st-century American male singers
21st-century American singers
20th-century American LGBT people
21st-century American LGBT people
American male songwriters